The Kumpo, the Samay, and the Niasse are three traditional figures in the mythology of the Diola in the Casamance (Senegal) and Gambia.

Multiple times in the course of the year, i.e. during the Journées culturelles, a folk festival in the village is organized. The Samay invites the people of the village to participate in the festivities.

He can run very hard and with his stick he mandates strict order in the community. He knows everything that happens in the village.

He can be considered the ceremony master of the traditional dance event.

Similar figures
Kumpo
Niasse

Casamance
Gambian culture
Jola religion
Senegalese culture